Addyme aspiciella is a moth of the family Pyralidae first described by Émile Louis Ragonot in 1889. It is found in Sri Lanka.

References

Moths of Asia
Moths described in 1889
Phycitini